Malcolm "Cam" Cameron (born February 6, 1961) is an American football coach.  He is the former offensive coordinator and quarterbacks coach of the LSU Tigers football program. Cameron attended Indiana University in Bloomington, Indiana and played quarterback for the school. Cameron began his coaching career in the NCAA with the Michigan Wolverines. After that he switched to the National Football League (NFL), where he was offensive coordinator for the Baltimore Ravens and the San Diego Chargers and head coach for the Miami Dolphins, coaching them to a 1–15 record in his only season.

Early years and education
Cameron was born February 6, 1961, in Chapel Hill, North Carolina. A multi-sport athlete, Cameron was an All-American quarterback at Terre Haute South Vigo High School in Terre Haute, Indiana. But before he went to Terre Haute South he also went to Saint Patrick School. He won the 1979 Trester Award for mental attitude as a guard on the high school basketball team which went to the state finals three years in a row. He played football and basketball at Indiana University under coaches Lee Corso and Bob Knight, respectively, until a knee injury ended his playing career. As an undergraduate, he was a member of the Kappa Sigma fraternity. He graduated from Indiana in 1983 with a bachelor's degree in business.

Coaching career

Michigan 
Cameron spent the first ten years of his career at the University of Michigan, where he learned from long-time Wolverine coach Bo Schembechler. After two years as a graduate assistant, he became Michigan's youngest assistant and was responsible for tutoring quarterbacks and receivers. He coached many future NFL players, including Jim Harbaugh, Elvis Grbac, Todd Collins, Amani Toomer, Derrick Alexander and Heisman Trophy winner Desmond Howard.  Cameron served as an assistant at Michigan alongside future head coaches Lloyd Carr, Gary Moeller, Les Miles, and Mike DeBord.  His fellow graduate assistant was Mike Trgovac, who was the former defensive line coach of the Green Bay Packers, after serving six years as the defensive coordinator of the Carolina Panthers.

Washington Redskins 
Cameron was the quarterbacks coach for the Washington Redskins between 1994 and 1996. He is credited with guiding quarterback Gus Frerotte to his only Pro Bowl appearance in 1997, and also played a key role in the development of Pro Bowl quarterback Trent Green.

Return to Indiana 
Cameron returned to his alma mater to serve as the head coach for the Indiana University Hoosiers in 1997. In five seasons, he achieved a record of 18-37. Cameron brought an explosive offense to Indiana with highly effective offensive players such as Antwaan Randle El. Indiana averaged 23.6 points per game under Cameron's guidance. In fact, Randle El became the first player in NCAA Division I history to pass for 40 career touchdowns and score 40 career rushing touchdowns.  He finished his college career as fifth on the all-time NCAA total yardage list, and became the first player in college football history to record 2,500 total yards for each of four consecutive years.

Although Cameron's Indiana teams won less than one-third of their games, Indiana was recognized by the American Football Coaches Association for its exemplary football graduation rates in each of Cameron's final four seasons. He was fired after the 2001 season.

San Diego Chargers
From 2002–2006, he served as the offensive coordinator for the San Diego Chargers. In 2004, San Diego scored 446 points, third-highest in the NFL that year and the third-most in team history. Following the 2004 campaign, Sports Illustrated named Cameron its Offensive Assistant of the Year. In 2005, the Chargers averaged 26.1 points per game, fifth in the NFL in that category. In 2006, the Chargers offense amassed a team-record 494 points while paving the way for league MVP LaDainian Tomlinson to break the single-season touchdown record. In addition to Tomlinson, Cameron had the opportunity to work with Pro Bowl quarterbacks Drew Brees and Philip Rivers, as well as All-Pro tight end Antonio Gates in San Diego. He brought in former Hoosier Kris Dielman as left guard.

Miami Dolphins
Cameron was interviewed for a number of head coaching jobs, including the Houston Texans and St. Louis Rams vacancies following the 2005 season but was not hired. Cameron also interviewed for the head coaching jobs with the Arizona Cardinals and Atlanta Falcons in January 2007 but Miami was the only club that made an offer.

By the time Cameron arrived, the Dolphins were coming off the abrupt resignation of their head coach Nick Saban, despite repeatedly saying he would stay in Miami and denied rumors of him taking the Alabama head coaching job. His 2007 Dolphins lost 13 consecutive games to start the season, before beating the Baltimore Ravens in overtime on December 16 for their first and only win that season. The Dolphins ended the 2007 season in last place in the AFC East with a franchise-worst 1–15 record, the worst record in the NFL that year and the worst in the team's 40-year history. On January 3, 2008, newly hired general manager Jeff Ireland announced Cameron had been fired along with most of his staff.

Baltimore Ravens
On January 23, 2008, Baltimore Ravens head coach John Harbaugh announced Cameron as the Ravens’ new offensive coordinator. Following a loss to the Washington Redskins in Week 14 of the 2012 NFL season, Cameron was released by the Ravens and replaced by Jim Caldwell. At the time of his release, he had helped the Ravens attain a 9–4 record.

After Cameron's firing, the Ravens went on to win Super Bowl XLVII against the San Francisco 49ers. Despite being fired as offensive coordinator after week 14, head coach of the Ravens John Harbaugh stated that Cameron deserved and would receive a Super Bowl ring, having helped the team for a majority of the season to get to the playoffs.

LSU
On February 8, 2013, it was reported on CBSSports.com that Cameron had accepted the offensive coordinator position at LSU, replacing Greg Studrawa. Later in the day this report was confirmed.

Entering 2013, Cameron had immediate success, as his LSU offense averaged 46 points in the first six games of the regular season. The Tiger offense finished the season 34th in the country in passing yards at 265.1 per game, 32nd in rushing yards at 200.8, 22nd points for at 37.0, and 32nd in total offense (LSU's best since 2007) at 5591 yards of total offense and a total average of 465.9 yards per game. Cameron has also been widely praised for the development of redshirt senior quarterback Zach Mettenberger who had the best season of his LSU career with a 64.9% completion percentage, and a 22–8 touchdown to interception ratio, a notable improvement over past seasons. 

On September 25, 2016, it was announced that Cameron was fired along with Les Miles after a 2–2 start to the season. Reports later indicated that it was incoming interim head coach Ed Orgeron who decided to release Cameron.

Head coaching record

College

NFL

References

1961 births
Living people
American football quarterbacks
Baltimore Ravens coaches
Indiana Hoosiers football coaches
Indiana Hoosiers football players
LSU Tigers football coaches
Miami Dolphins head coaches
Michigan Wolverines football coaches
National Football League offensive coordinators
San Diego Chargers coaches
Washington Redskins coaches
People from Chapel Hill, North Carolina
Sportspeople from Terre Haute, Indiana
Coaches of American football from Indiana
Players of American football from Indiana